Henan Jeong clan is one of the Korean clans. Their Bon-gwan is in Henan, China. According to the research held in 2000, the number of Henan Jeong clan’s member was 7766. Their founder was  who worked as Minister of the Guards in Yuan dynasty during Toghon Temür’s reign.  entered Goryeo as a fatherly master with Kong Shao and 20 or more people when Queen Noguk had an marriage to an ordinary person planned by Gongmin of Goryeo.  worked as In-palace equerry censors during Chungjeong of Goryeo’s reign, granted High Merit Minister in 1352 and became Prince of Hansan. ’s descendant founded Henan Jeong clan and made Henan, Henan Jeong clan’s Bon-gwan.

See also 
 Korean clan names of foreign origin

References

External links 
 

 
Jeong clans
Korean clan names of Chinese origin